The Main Department of Internal Affairs of the city of Kyiv was a police force established in 1858 in Kyiv as the Kyiv Municipal Police (Київська міська поліція). It was the largest municipal police force in Ukraine, with primary responsibilities in law enforcement and investigation in Ukrainian capital. The Kyiv Police was one of the oldest police departments in Ukraine. Its headquarters were located at Volodymyr Street 15 in Kyiv.

The Kyiv Police is part of the Ministry of Internal Affairs (MVS); the police is also subordinate to the Kyiv government. Their main responsibilities were internal security, human rights and freedoms, suppression and detection of crime, and protection of public order.

The police is headed by the chief, who is appointed and removed from office by Presidential decree on the recommendation of the Minister of Internal Affairs. Before he suggests a nomination, the president consults the mayor of Kyiv. The police is overseen by the MVS and the government of Kyiv.

Since August 2021, the Head of Kyiv police has been Ivan Vyhovsky. As of the 14th of February 2022, all personnel of the Kyiv Police were transferred to the National Police of Ukraine.

Kyiv City Police Commissioners
The Kyiv City Police Commissioner (officially called The Head of Kyiv's Internal Affairs Department) is the head of the Kyiv City Police Department, appointed by the Ministry of Internal Affairs.

 Yuri Oleksandrovich Smirnov (2000–2001)
 Vitaliy Grigorievich Yarema (2005–2010)
 Valriy Volodymyrovich Koryak (2010–2014)
 Yuri Leonidovich Moroz (2014-2015)
Aleksandr Farsevich  (2015)
 (2015-2021)
Ivan Vyhovsky (since 2021)

See also

 National Police of Ukraine

References

External links
Official website (in Ukrainian)
Kyiv Police – YouTube official channel

1858 establishments in the Russian Empire
Organizations established in 1858
Police
Municipal law enforcement agencies of Ukraine

uk:Головне управління Національної поліції у місті Києві